Sinokele is a monotypic genus of beetles in the family Buprestidae, the jewel beetles. The single species is Sinokele mirabilis.

This beetle is native to southern China, where it lives on pine trees.

References

Monotypic Buprestidae genera
Insects of China